Ameran Bitsadze is a Georgia mixed martial artist. He competed in the Super Heavyweight division.

Mixed martial arts record

|-
| Loss
| align=center| 1-4
| Rokas Stambrauskas
| KO
| Rings Lithuania: Bushido Rings 5: Shock
| 
| align=center| 1
| align=center| 5:00
| Vilnius, Lithuania
| 
|-
| Loss
| align=center| 1-3
| Yoshihisa Yamamoto
| Submission (armbar)
| Rings: King of Kings 2000 Block B
| 
| align=center| 1
| align=center| 4:39
| Osaka, Japan
| 
|-
| Win
| align=center| 1-2
| Andrey Reznik
| TKO
| Rings: Russia vs. Georgia
| 
| align=center| 1
| align=center| 2:24
| Tula, Russia
| 
|-
| Loss
| align=center| 0-2
| Joop Kasteel
| Submission (arm triangle choke)
| Rings Holland: The King of Rings
| 
| align=center| 1
| align=center| 2:15
| North Holland, Netherlands
| 
|-
| Loss
| align=center| 0-1
| Yoshihisa Yamamoto
| N/A
| Rings: Battle Dimensions Tournament 1995 Opening Round
| 
| align=center| 0
| align=center| 0:00
| 
|

See also
List of male mixed martial artists

References

External links
 
 Ameran Bitsadze at mixedmartialarts.com

Male mixed martial artists from Georgia (country)
Super heavyweight mixed martial artists
Living people
Year of birth missing (living people)